Numerous industrial narrow-gauge lines were built for peat extraction, clay extraction for brickworks and construction sites.

Nowadays, much of this industrial rail heritage is preserved in museums or in theme parks, such as the Efteling Steam Train Company.

Tram

 Geldersch-Westfaalsche Stoomtram-Maatschappij; 
 Geldersche Stoomtramweg Maatschappij; 
 Rotterdamse Tramweg Maatschappij; 
 Stoomtram Walcheren; 
 Tramweg Maatschappij De Graafschap; 
 Tramweg Maatschappij Zutphen-Emmerik; 
 Tramweg Onderneming Gouda-Bodegraven;

Narrow-gauge heritage railways

 Eerste Drentse vereniging van Stoomliefhebbers in the peat heritage museum in Barger-Compascuum; 4 km, .
 Efteling Steam Train Company, amusement park

See also 
 Ledesma Mill Railway A  gauge railway in Argentina.

References

Railway lines in the Netherlands
 
1200 mm gauge railways